The Point Reyes Light is a weekly newspaper published since 1948 in western Marin County, California. It is generally considered the newspaper of record for the region. The Light gained national attention in 1979 due to its reporting on a cult, Synanon, and the Pulitzer Prize awarded to the paper for this coverage. The paper is owned by Tess Elliott and David Briggs.

In the late 2000s, the paper was itself the subject of local controversy and national coverage, based on a dispute between the then publishers (owners from 2005 to 2010) and their predecessors, over perceived changes in both style and content. The current editor, Tess Elliott, has restored the paper's original style, while continuing to improve content and upholding a standard of rigorous reporting and engaging prose. She and her partner David Briggs also created the North Coaster, a quarterly guide to the northern California coast, featuring local artists, writers and poets.

The Light covers regional issues in and near West Marin, including the communities of Point Reyes Station, Inverness, Olema, Bolinas, Inverness Park, Nicasio, Stinson Beach, the San Geronimo Valley, Tomales, and the nearby Point Reyes National Seashore, as well as Fairfax and Bodega Bay. Other media outlets serving this region include the community FM radio station KWMR. The Light purchased its years long competitor, the West Marin Citizen in 2015.

History

Dave and Wilma Rogers on March 1, 1948, founded the paper as The Baywood Press, a name it retained for its first 18 years. At first, the paper was published in neighboring Inverness but moved to Point Reyes Station (present pop. 750) within a year. It was renamed the Point Reyes Light by publishers Don and Clara Mae DeWolfe in 1966 after the Point Reyes Lighthouse. For many years the logo in the newspaper's banner and masthead has been an image of the lens and upper structure of the Lighthouse.

In 1951, Al and Madonna Bartlett, both experienced newspeople, bought the newspaper. Although they were one of the paper's few owners to ever make a profit, they sold it in 1956 to George and Nancy Sherman. In 1958, the Shermans sold The Baywood Press to Don and Clara Mae DeWolfe, who on September 8, 1966, renamed it The Point Reyes Light. Don DeWolfe later explained that he grew tired of out-of-town advertisers asking, “Where the hell is Baywood?”

DeWolfe owned the newspaper 13 years, counting on a commercial print shop to help keep the business profitable. In 1970, however, the DeWolfes sold The Point Reyes Light to Michael and Annabelle Gahagan.

The Light in those days was still printed in-house on a 1910 flatbed, web Goss press. Production was laborious and expensive, and after six years of financial frustration, the Gahagans sold the newspaper to David and Cathy Mitchell, who had both previously worked for other newspapers.

With their first issue in August 1975, the Mitchells converted The Light from hot-type to offset reproduction, farmed out the printing, and sold the old Goss press for $1. By using modern production techniques and a central printing plant, The Light eventually was able to make a small profit.

When the Mitchells divorced in 1981, they sold The Light to Rosalie Laird and her short-term partner Ace Ramos. Laird owned The Light from October 1, 1981, to December 31, 1983, when David Mitchell reacquired it through a default action.

The Mitchells and the Pulitzer Prize
Dave and Cathy Mitchell bought the Light in 1975 for $47,000, when its circulation was 1,700. Dave Mitchell became the editor and they were co-publishers.

In 1979 under the Mitchells, the Light earned the Pulitzer Prize for Public Service for reporting on a cult, Synanon, which had a major presence in the area and had attempted to murder an attorney who won a lawsuit against the cult. The San Francisco Examiner dropped their coverage of Synanon after libel threats.

The Light won the Meritorious Public Service gold medal for an exposé of Synanon Incorporated, a onetime drug-rehabilitation program that changed its name to the Church of Synanon and evolved into a violent cult. Mitchell began reporting on Synanon, which was headquartered in the nearby town of Marshall, in early 1978 as violent incidents involving its followers began coming to his newspaper's attention. At the height of its violence, Synanon members on October 10, 1978, tried to kill Los Angeles attorney Paul Morantz by planting a rattlesnake in his mailbox. Morantz survived being bitten, and in an October 19, 1978, article, Mitchell revealed that Synanon founder Charles Dederich had been calling for an attack on Morantz, who three weeks earlier had won a $300,000 judgment against the cult. Dederich and followers Lance Kenton and Joe Musico were later arrested and in July 1980 pleaded no contest to charges of conspiracy to commit murder.

Working with his wife and University of California at Berkeley sociologist Richard Ofshe (an unpaid consultant for the Synanon investigation), Mitchell subsequently wrote The Light on Synanon: How a Country Weekly Exposed a Corporate Cult and Won the Pulitzer Prize. The book was published in 1980 by Seaview Books, then a wholly owned division of Playboy, and was made into a two-hour movie for CBS, Attack on Fear.

Lawyers for Synanon responded to the exposé by filing six libel suits against the Mitchells. The Mitchells received a pro bono defense from Heller Ehrman White and McAuliffe, which in representing them won a significant victory for the state's press. In its 1984 decision Mitchell v. (Marin) Superior Court, the California Supreme Court ruled that reporters could often keep confidential sources secret in libel and other civil cases without forfeiting their defense. The cult settled the litigation it had instigated by paying the Mitchells $100,000, and Mitchell published a photo of the check on The Light's front page.

The Mitchells sold the Light to Ace Ramos and Rosalee Laird in 1981. Dave Mitchell returned as editor and publisher in 1984 after working for the San Francisco Examiner as a general assignment reporter and covering the wars in El Salvador and Guatemala.

The Light's Accomplishments

After Mitchell's return, the paper's longest-running story was a series on five historic waves of immigration to Point Reyes in the previous 150 years. Despite being a small-town weekly with only about 4,000 circulation, The Light sent reporters abroad four times in 13 years to interview relatives of Point Reyes’ immigrant families to learn why some members left the old country and some did not.

One purpose of the series was to defuse the term immigrant and put in perspective an ongoing immigration from Jalostotitlán, Mexico. In 1988 and 1991, The Light sent reporters to Jalostotitlán. It also hired 11-year-old Alicia Hernandez to write a weekly Spanish-language column describing West Marin from a young Latina's perspective, and in 1986, a special issue of Newsweek magazine named her one of “100 New American Heroes.” Highlights of all of those reports are featured in Mitchell's book, The Light On The Coast,

Despite its small size, the paper began sending reporters and photographers on overseas assignments to report on five waves of historic immigration to West Marin. In 1988 and 1991, The Light sent reporters to Jalostotitlán in southern Mexico to report on immigration then underway. It also hired 11-year-old Alicia Hernandez to write a weekly column describing West Marin from a young Latina's perspective, and in 1986, a special issue of Newsweek magazine named her one of “100 New American Heroes.”

In 1995, the paper sent reporters to Ticino, the Italian-speaking canton of Switzerland, and to war-torn Croatia. In 1997, a Light reporter went to Northern Ireland, the Republic of Ireland, and Portugal's Azores to research historic immigrations from those islands.

The immigration reports won both journalism awards and attention from other news media. In a special report on America's First Amendment, German’s ARD television network in 1989 observed, “America’s small newspapers top the list of things US citizens can take pride in, and among America’s best small papers is The Point Reyes Light.”

The Plotkin Era

In late 2005, Dave Mitchell sold the Light to Bolinas resident Robert Plotkin for $500,000. The two men soon had a falling out, culminating in an angry encounter outside the newspaper's office the following February. In May 2006, a Marin Superior Court commissioner issued an injunction that temporarily prohibited Mitchell from visiting the paper, as well as a three-year injunction (later dismissed in Marin Superior Court case no. CV 063456) barring him from contacting Plotkin and his family.

The following August, Plotkin obtained a court injunction forbidding Mitchell from posting his column on the Bodega Bay Navigator website. The ruling was based on a non-competition clause signed by Mitchell at the time of the Light's sale. In January 2008, Mitchell and Plotkin said they had reached out-of-court settlements on "...a pair of lawsuits and countersuits, which involved financial and non-financial matters." The terms were not disclosed.

Plotkin initially relied on a succession of interns recruited from journalism schools for much of the paper's reporting. "The only way to get the right esprit de corps — the people directed to a higher calling — is to invite [journalism students] to join the Round Table and go on a quest for the chalice," Plotkin told a Los Angeles Times reporter. "I fashion myself as sort of a Che Guevara. This paper is the Dunkirk of literary journalism. Our backs are against the wall. The Huns are upon us. It's time to fight."

In his first months, Plotkin published a sprinkling of edgier stories, which both stirred controversy while helping garner attention far beyond West Marin. Subjects included a local rapist, a body found by a mushroomer, and a satanic gathering near Point Reyes with a picture of a young woman biting into a severed goat head. Such stories, and the editorial sensibility behind them, led to angry letters from some readers, but also to profiles in the San Francisco Chronicle, Los Angeles Times and New York Times. In June 2006, Plotkin wrote editorial apologies for two items: a photo of young teens dancing in a manner that some saw as suggestive and for coverage that seemed to dismiss efforts by local merchants to encourage local shopping. The latter resulted in several merchants refusing to sell the next issue.

During his first year, Plotkin wrote fewer editorials than Mitchell and less about the community. He sometimes took an unorthodox approach, such as publishing pictures of and by his children, as well as a 1920s essay by T. E. Lawrence. But a one-year anniversary issue composed largely of material reprinted from the previous 12 months displayed wide and varied local coverage with an emphasis on feature stories and profiles. Plotkin took the occasion to note that while circulation has increased, income was down due to more readers purchasing the newspaper from merchants, who take a 25% cut. As would later be revealed, income was also reduced by a bookkeeper's $62,000 embezzlement scheme.

In April 2007, Plotkin converted production from manual paste-up to electronic publishing, while instituting a redesign by the Tampa firm Garcia Media that employed color pages and a more contemporary style. Plotkin also announced expanded coverage to Fairfax, a town bordering but outside West Marin. These changes further galvanized the newspaper's critics, who complained that the Light had lost its regional focus, local voice, and historical roots.

A competing newspaper, the West Marin Citizen, debuted on July 5, 2007 (following a pilot edition in June) – published by Bodega Bay Navigator publisher Joel Hack, edited by former Light managing editor Jim Kravets, and staffed by several of his former colleagues. The Citizen'''s backers said the paper would place more emphasis on community reporting. In response, Plotkin noted that the Light had already become more community focused through the addition of a weekly calendar section, an expanded letters section, and a page marking noteworthy achievements. He predicted that reader interest in the new paper would be fleeting.

The ensuing newspaper war would give West Marin two print newspapers at a time when many small communities had none. In Business Week, Bodega Bay resident Peter Laufer wrote that, as a journalist, he missed a local newspaper more than a main square or a saloon. He wrote that the Navigator had become a "minimal Internet presence" due to scarce advertising dollars, driving Hack to compete instead "...with the now infamous Point Reyes Light."

The Light and the Citizen were the subject of a critique in the January 2008 Columbia Journalism Review. Author Jonathan Rowe, a station host at KWMR, described the struggles of the Light under Plotkin, including Plotkin's reliance on unpaid interns, perceived lack of coverage of local civic matters, and house style that, Rowe argued, appears written more for an outside audience than for the community.

Financial struggles and the creation of the L3C

In 2008, the Lights income dropped 37 percent, resulting in a loss of between $5,000 and $15,000 a month. In a January 2009 editorial, Plotkin wrote that the Light had been hit by some of the same factors affecting the entire sector, including the economic downturn, a loss of retail and real estate advertising, as well as classified advertising that had shifted to Craigslist. With credit difficult to obtain, Robert Plotkin and his wife, Lys Plotkin, sought a buyer and considered two offers: from a local newspaper chain, Marinscope, and a locally owned limited liability company called Mount Vision Associates, which proposed merging the Light and the Citizen. Neither deal panned out. While the numbers under negotiation were not disclosed, Plotkin wrote that in 2005, he had purchased the Light and a sister publication, The Coastal Traveler, for $500,000. By 2008, he estimated that the value of the Light alone was $274,000. The potential sale to Mount Vision was also hampered by the terms of the proposed deal. Plotkin wrote that the LLC only offered to buy the Light’s name, website and files, “...leaving me with all the liabilities, including cyclical bills and taxes.” He wrote that the deal would have also involved firing the entire staff without severance pay.

The three members of Mount Vision, including author Philip Fradkin, responded in a Citizen guest column that their offer was based on an appraisal conducted by the former publisher of a regional weekly newspaper who had studied the Light'''s books. The group wrote that their offer was for the newspaper's assets, not its liabilities, "...which would have economically sunk any succeeding publication," and that the while the merged paper could not guarantee employment, that decision would have been made by a different organizational structure than their own.

In an effort to restore the paper to financial health, the Plotkins announced price raises for both newsstand copies and subscriptions, as well as Lys taking over as the Lights publisher, leaving Robert to work full time on The Coastal Traveler. He noted that with this new regime, the Light would be markedly different than the one he first published, with a different publisher, editor, and advertising manager. The paper "...has tempered its provocation but never its investigatory zeal. It has grown gentler and kinder but not lost its strength, much like the three women who lead it now."

The Marin Media Institute
On May 21, 2010, the Light was sold to the Marin Media Institute, and operated as a low-profit limited liability company.

Current publishers
In May 2015, Tess Elliott and David Briggs bought the Light from the Marin Media Institute. It is now operated as an LLC.

Publishers
 Dave and Wilma Rogers 1948-1951 (Baywood Press, first issue March 1948)
 Al and Madonna Bartlett 1951-1956 (Baywood Press)
 George and Nancy Sherman 1956-1957 (Baywood Press)
 Don and Clara Mae DeWolfe 1957-1970 (Changed to Point Reyes Light in 1966)
 Michael and Annabelle Gahagan 1970-1975
 Dave and Cathy Mitchell 1975-1981
 Ace Ramos and Rosalee Laird 1981-1983
 Dave Mitchell 1984-2005
 Robert and/or Lys Plotkin 2005- mid-2010
 The Marin Media Institute 2010 - 2015 (Editor Tess Elliott)
 Tess Elliott and David Briggs 2015 - Present

Contributors
 Art Rogers
Art Rogers has provided photographs published in the feature "Point Reyes Family Album' since 1975. The Album's pages include portraits of babies and newlyweds, panoramic photos of multi-generation familily gatherings, and then-and-now pairings showing the passage of time in local families and places. One of Rogers' 1980 photos for the Album, of a local couple holding eight puppies, was used by Jeff Koons as the basis for a sculpture called "String of Puppies," After Koons put several of the sculptures on sale at a New York gallery, Rogers sued for copyright infringement, winning at the District Court in 1990 and winning an appeal in 1992. (See Rogers v. Koons.) The case was eventually settled out of court and is frequently referred to in articles on the appropriation or "transformative reinterpretation" of one artist's work by another.

 Dewey Livingston

Dewey Livingston is a celebrated historian and the author of Nicasio: The Historic Valley at the Center of Marin, Tamalpais Trails and Point Reyes Peninsula: Olema, Point Reyes Station, and Inverness.

 Victor Reyes writes a column in Spanish on Latin American issues of local relevance, which also appears in English translation.
 Loretta Farley, of the National Park Service, reports on park happenings and natural events.

Awards

In addition to the 1979 Pulitzer Prize for Public Service, the Point Reyes Light consistently wins awards from the California Newspaper Publishers Association and National Newspaper Association, including nine awards for work done in 2006.

Notes

External links
 Point Reyes Light Official website
 Robert Plotkin bio
 David Mitchell's blog
 West Marin Citizen
 KWMR West Marin news podcasts

Newspapers published in the San Francisco Bay Area
Mass media in Marin County, California
Pulitzer Prize-winning newspapers
Publications established in 1948
Local mass media in California
1948 establishments in California
Pulitzer Prize for Public Service winners
Weekly newspapers published in California